This page details statistics of the AFC Futsal Club Championship

General performances

By Nation

Winners by club

All-time AFC Futsal Club Championship table  (By Clubs)
As end of 2019 AFC Futsal Club Championship.
{|class="wikitable"
!Best Finish
|width=30px bgcolor=gold| ||Winner
|width=30px bgcolor=silver| ||Runners-up
|width=30px bgcolor=CC9966| ||Semifinals
|width=30px bgcolor=90EE90| ||Quarterfinals
|}
{| class="wikitable sortable" style=text-align:center
!Rank
!width=25%|Club
!Seasons
!Games
!W
!D
!L
!GF
!GA
!GD
!Pts
!
!
!
!
|- bgcolor=gold
| 1 ||align=left|  Nagoya Oceans || 9 || 43 || 23 || 6 || 8 || 176 || 104 || +72 || 93 || 4 || || 3 || 1

|- bgcolor=gold
| 2 ||align=left|  Chonburi Blue Wave || 8 || 32 || 19 || 7 || 6 || 130 || 79|| +51 || 64 || 2 || 1 || 1 ||1

|-bgcolor=silver
| 3 ||align=left|  Thái Sơn Nam || 6 || 29 || 16 || 4 || 9 || 107 || 89 || +18 || 52 || || 1 || 3 ||

|- bgcolor=gold
| 4 ||align=left|  Giti Pasand || 3 || 15 || 12 || 1 || 2 || 58 || 22 || +36 || 37 || 1 || 2 || ||

|-bgcolor=silver
| 5 ||align=left|  Naft Al-Wasat || 5 || 23 || 11 || 4 || 8 || 88 || 75 || +13 || 37 || || 1 || 2 || 1

|-bgcolor=gold
| 6 ||align=left| Mes Sungun || 2 || 12 || 10 || 0 || 2 || 61 || 23 || +38 || 30 || 1 || 1 || ||

|-bgcolor=#CC9966 
| 7 ||align=left|  Bank of Beirut || 5 || 19 || 8 || 3 || 8 || 78 || 72 || +6 || 27 || || || 1 || 2

|- bgcolor=#CC9966
| 8 ||align=left|  Al Rayyan || 5 || 22 || 7 || 2 || 13 || 61 || 89 || -28 || 23 || || || 3 || 1

|-bgcolor=gold
| 9 ||align=left|  Tasisat Daryaei || 2 || 8 || 7 || 1 || 0 || 45 || 17 || +28 || 22 || 1 || || || 1

|- bgcolor=silver
| 10 ||align=left|  Al Sadd || 3 || 12 || 6 || 0 || 6 || 57 || 44 || +13 || 18 || || 1 || || 1

|-bgcolor=#CC9966
| 11 ||align=left|  Shenzhen Nanling || 5 || 18 || 5 || 3 || 10 || 55 || 76 || -21 || 18 || || || 2 ||1

|-bgcolor=#CC9966 
| 12 ||align=left|  Thai Port || 2 || 10 || 5 || 2 || 3 || 42 || 35 || +7 || 17 || || || 1 ||1

|- bgcolor=gold
| 13 ||align=left|  Foolad Mahan || 1 || 5 || 5 || 0 || 0 || 36 || 9 || +27 || 15 || 1 || || ||

|- bgcolor=90EE90
| 14 ||align=left|  Osh EREM || 3 || 10 || 5 || 0 || 5 || 26 || 38 || -12 || 15 || || || || 1

|-bgcolor=90EE90
| 15 ||align=left|  Al Dhafrah || 3 || 10 || 4 || 1 || 5 || 29 || 25 || +4 || 13 || || || || 1

|-bgcolor=90EE90
| 16 ||align=left|  Vamos Mataram || 3 || 11 || 4 || 1 || 6 || 34 || 36 || -2 || 13 || || || ||2

|- bgcolor=silver
| 17 ||align=left|  Shahid Mansouri || 1 || 5 || 4 || 0 || 1 || 22 || 17 || +5 || 12 || || 1 || ||

|-bgcolor=silver
| 18 ||align=left|  Al Qadsia || 2 || 8 || 3 || 2 || 3 || 38 || 37 || +1 || 11 || || 1 || ||

|- bgcolor=silver
| 19 ||align=left|  Ardus || 3 || 11 || 3 || 2 || 6 || 34 || 35 || -1 || 11 || || 1 || ||

|-bgcolor=#CC9966
| 20 ||align=left|  AGMK || 4 || 14 || 3 || 1 || 10 || 36 || 66 || -30 || 10 || || || 1 || 1

|- bgcolor=#CC9966
| 21 ||align=left|  Al Sadaka || 2 || 8 || 2 || 2 || 4 || 24 || 24 || 0 || 8 || || || 1 ||

|-bgcolor=#CC9966 
| 22 ||align=left|  Dabiri || 1 || 5 || 2 || 1 || 2 || 20 || 17 || +3 || 7 || || || 1 ||

|-
| 23 ||align=left|  Pro's Cafe || 1 || 4 || 2 || 1 || 1 || 19 || 18 || +1 || 7 || || || ||

|-
| 24 ||align=left|  Wuhan Dilong || 1 || 4 || 2 || 0 || 2 || 23 || 22 || +1 || 6 || || || ||

|-bgcolor=90EE90
| 25 ||align=left| Sanna Khánh Hòa || 1 || 3 || 2 || 0 || 1 || 8 || 8 || 0 || 6 || || || || 1

|-bgcolor=#CC9966
| 26 ||align=left|  Dibba Al-Hisn || 1 || 5 || 1 || 2 || 2 || 11 || 14 || -3 || 5 || || || 1 ||

|-
| 27 ||align=left|  Dalian Yuan Dynasty || 2 || 5 || 1 || 2 || 2 || 9 || 17 || -8 || 5 || || || ||

|-bgcolor=90EE90
| 28 ||align=left|  MFC Emgek || 1 || 3 || 1 || 1 || 1 || 11 || 9 || +2 || 4 || || || || 1

|-
| 29 ||align=left|  All Sports || 1 || 3 || 1 || 1 || 1 || 11 || 10 || +1 || 4 || || || ||

|-bgcolor=90EE90
| 30 ||align=left|  Shriker Osaka || 1 || 3 || 1 || 0 || 2 || 9 || 8 || +1 || 3 || || || || 1

|-
| 31 ||align=left|  Yarmouk || 1 || 3 || 1 || 0 || 2 || 10 || 10 || 0 || 3 || || || ||

|-
| 32 ||align=left|  Soro Company || 1 || 3 || 1 || 0 || 2 || 12 || 18 || -6 || 3 || || || ||

|-
| 33 ||align=left|  Al-Sailiya || 1 || 3 || 1 || 0 || 2 || 7 || 13 || -6 || 3 || || || ||

|-
| 34 ||align=left|  Lokomotiv Tashkent || 2 || 5 || 1 || 0 || 4 || 15 || 25 || -10 || 3 || || || ||

|-
| 35 ||align=left|  AUB-Altyn-Tash || 1 || 3 || 1 || 0 || 2 || 9 || 20 || -11 || 3 || || || ||

|-
| 36 ||align=left|  Sipar Khujand || 1 || 3 || 1 || 0 || 2 || 6 || 21 || -15 || 3 || || || ||

|-
| 37 ||align=left|  Al Karkh || 1 || 3 || 0 || 1 || 2 || 11 || 15 || -4 || 1 || || || ||

|-
| 38 ||align=left|  Al Mayadeen || 1 || 2 || 0 || 1 || 1 || 4 || 8 || -4 || 1 || || || ||

|-
| 39 ||align=left|  Zhejiang Dragon || 1 || 3 || 0 || 1 || 2 || 6 || 18 || -12 || 1 || || || ||

|-
| 40 ||align=left|  Vic Vipers || 4 || 11 || 0 || 1 || 10 || 17 || 55 || -38 || 1 || || || ||

|-
| 41 ||align=left|  FS Seoul || 1 || 3 || 0 || 0 || 3 || 5 || 11 || -6 || 0 || || || ||

|-
| 42 ||align=left|  Disi Invest || 1 || 2 || 0 || 0 || 2 || 3 || 9 || -6 || 0 || || || ||

|-
| 43 ||align=left|  Taiwan Power || 1 || 2 || 0 || 0 || 2 || 0 || 7 || -7 || 0 || || || ||

|-
| 44 ||align=left|  Kazma || 1 || 3 || 0 || 0 || 3 || 5 || 14 || -9 || 0 || || || ||

|-
| 45 ||align=left|  NSW Thunder || 1 || 4 || 0 || 0 || 4 || 15 || 27 || -12 || 0 || || || ||

|-
| 46 ||align=left|  Stroitel Zarafshan || 1 || 3 || 0 || 0 || 3 || 7 || 22 || -15 || 0 || || || ||

|-
| 47 ||align=left|  Al-Khaleej || 1 || 2 || 0 || 0 || 2 || 2 || 17 || -15 || 0 || || || ||

|-
| 48 ||align=left|  Victoria University College || 2 || 6 || 0 || 0 || 6 || 10 || 28 || -18 || 0 || || || ||

|-
| 49 ||align=left|  Jeonju MAG || 1 || 3 || 0 || 0 || 3 || 4 || 25 || -21 || 0 || || || ||
|}

All-time AFC Futsal Club Championship table (By Nations) 
As end of 2019 AFC Futsal Club Championship.

Number of participating clubs
The following is a list of clubs that have played in the Champions League group stages. The list is arrayed in alphabetical order of nation.

Team in Bold: qualified for knockout phase

Clubs

By semifinal appearances

Unbeaten sides
Sixe clubs have won either the AFC Futsal Club Championship unbeaten:
Foolad Mahan had 5 wins in 2010.
Nagoya Oceans had 5 wins in 2011.
Giti Pasand had 5 wins in 2012.
Tasisat Daryaei had 5 wins in 2015.
Chonburi Bluewave had 5 wins in 2017.
Mes Sungun had 6 wins in 2018.
Nagoya Oceans had 6 wins in 2019.

Consecutive participations
 Chonburi Bluewave hold the record number of consecutive participations in the AFC Futsal Club Championship with 8 from 2011 to 2018.

Winning other trophies

Biggest wins
The following teams won a single match by six goals or more:

Countries

Specific group stage records

6 wins

6 draws

6 losses

Players

All-time appearances

Goalscoring

All-time top goalscorers 

excluding qualifying games

Top scorer awards 
The top scorer award is for the player who amassed the most goals in the tournament, excluding the qualifying rounds.
Vahid Shamsaei (Foolad Mahan) has the record for most goals in one season with 17 in 2010
Kaoru Morioka (Nagoya Oceans) has the record for fewest goals in one season with 5 in 2014
Iranian players have received the most awards with 5:
Vahid Shamsaei in 2010 and 2015
Ali Asghar Hassanzadeh in 2011
Ahmad Esmaeilpour in 2012
Mahdi Javid in 2018

Hat-tricks

List of hat-tricks

 4 Player scored 4 goals
 5 Player scored 5 goals
 6 Player scored 6 goals

Other records

Most wins

Oldest and youngest

Disciplinary

Managers

References

External links 

records and statistics
International club association football competition records and statistics